Karl Anton or Karel Anton (25 October 1898  12 April 1979) was a Bohemian-born German film director, screenwriter and film producer.

Biography
He was born in Prague on 25 October 1898. His father Wilhelm Anton (1861–1918) was a physician. Anton studied medicine, but left the school after his father's death. He started as a stage actor and director in Vienna, Linz and Prague. During the World War I Anton made amateur documentaries with his friends Karel Lamač and Otto Heller.  He directed his first movie, a lyrical drama Gypsies, in 1921. Anton is considered an early proponent of Czech lyrical cinema tradition. He founded his own production companies Antonfilm (1923–30) and Sonorfilm (1930–32).

After the international success of Tonka of the Gallows he worked in Paris for Paramount Pictures from 1932 to 1935. After leaving Paramount he moved to Germany in 1935. He died in Berlin, Germany in 1979. Czech actor Raoul Schránil was his cousin.

Selected filmography

 Gypsies (1922)
 The Kidnapping of Fux the Banker (1923)
 The May Fairy (1926)
 Tonka of the Gallows (1930)
 A Girl from the Reeperbahn (1930)
 The Affair of Colonel Redl (1931)
 The Case of Colonel Redl (1931)
 Monsieur Albert (1932)
 The Champion Cook (1932)
 The Naked Truth (1932)
 The Porter from Maxim's (1933)
 Monsieur Sans-Gêne (1935)
 White Slaves (1936)
 We Danced Around the World (1939)
 The Star of Rio (1940)
 The Thing About Styx (1942)
 The Big Number (1943)
 Peter Voss, Thief of Millions (1946)
 Barry (1949)
 The Appeal to Conscience (1949)
 The Exchange (1952)
 The Cousin from Nowhere (1953)
 The Rose of Stamboul (1953)
 We'll Talk About Love Later (1953)
 Clivia (1954)
 Bonjour Kathrin (1956)
 The Daring Swimmer (1957)
 Victor and Victoria (1957)
 The Avenger (1960)

References

External links
 

1898 births
1979 deaths
20th-century German screenwriters
German male screenwriters
German film directors
Czechoslovak film directors
Czechoslovak male film actors
German male writers
German film editors
German Bohemian people
Silent film directors
Film directors from Prague
Czechoslovak emigrants to Germany